Robert Lee Hammond (born February 20, 1952) is a former American professional football player and coach. He was a running back in the National Football League (NFL) for five seasons with the New York Giants and Washington Redskins after playing collegiately at Morgan State University. Hammond also was an assistant coach in the NFL for 11 years and served as head coach for the London Monarchs of the World League of American Football (WLAF) from 1995 to 1996.

Early years
Hammond played high school football at Bayside High School in Bayside, New York.

External links
 

1952 births
Living people
American football running backs
London Monarchs coaches
Morgan State Bears football players
New York Giants players
New York Jets coaches
People from Orangeburg, South Carolina
Philadelphia Eagles coaches
Phoenix Cardinals coaches
Washington Redskins players
Bayside High School (Queens) alumni